Bhubaneswar–Cuttack Police Commissionerate(Odia:ଭୁବନେଶ୍ଵର-କଟକ ପୋଲିସ କମିଶନରେଟ),established in 2008, is a city police force with primary responsibilities in law enforcement and investigation within the metropolitan area of Bhubaneswar-Cuttack (respectively the capital and the former capital of the Indian state of Odisha).  It was formed under the Orissa Urban Police Act, 2003 by a gazette notification which came into effect on 1 January 2008. It has 43 police stations under its jurisdiction. Mr. S.K. Priyadarshi, IPS is currently the Commissioner of the Bhubaneswar–Cuttack Police Commissionerate.

Structure and jurisdiction
The Police Commissionerate is situated at Bhubaneswar, and is divided into two urban police districts- Bhubaneswar and Cuttack. The Commissionerate is responsible for law enforcement over the urban agglomeration of Bhubaneswar and Cuttack with the help of 43 police stations under it. The Commissionerate is headed by the Commissioner of Police, who is an Indian Police Service officer in the rank of Inspector-General of Police (IGP). The Commissioner is assisted by two Additional Commissioners. There are six Deputy Commissioners of Police (D.C.P), Law Officer, Public Relation Officer, Accounts Officer and 31 Additional Deputy Commissioner of Police, 68 Inspector/ Subedars and a large number of other officers & ministerial staffs to assist the commissioner. The police stations are headed by an Inspector.

Police stations

Bhubaneswar division
 Capital
 Kharvelnagar
 Saheed Nagar
 Nayapalli
 Khandagiri
 Mancheswar
 Chandrasekharpur
 ShreeLingaraj
 Badagada
 Airfield
 Laxmisagar
 Jatni
 Mahila Police Station, Rajpath
 Spl. Energy, Power House Square
 Chandaka
 Balianta
 Balipatna
 Infocity
 Nandankanan
 Tamando
 Dhauli
 Traffic Police Station, A.G Square
 Bharatpur

Cuttack division
 Cantonment
 Bidanasi
 Markatnagar
 Lalbag
 Purighat
 Madhupatna
 Chauliaganj
 Malgodown
 Mangalabag
 Daraghabazar
 Mahila
 Choudwar
 Jagatpur
 Spl. Energy
 Sadar
 Baranga
 Badambadi
 Kandarpur
 CDA Phase-II
 Traffic
 Traffic NH Phulnakhara

References 

Metropolitan law enforcement agencies of India
Government of Bhubaneswar
Cuttack
Odisha Police
2008 establishments in Orissa
Government agencies established in 2008